The Fiat G.8 was a military utility aircraft produced in Italy in the mid-1930s. Its design and production were undertaken at the CMASA works in Pisa which became part of Fiat in 1930, hence the type is sometimes referred to as the CMASA G.8 or Fiat-CMASA G.8. It was a conventional biplane design with staggered wings of unequal span braced by struts arranged in a Warren truss. The pilot and a single passenger (or instructor) sat in tandem open cockpits, and the aircraft was fitted with fixed tailskid undercarriage with divided main units.

Sixty of these aircraft were purchased by the Regia Aeronautica and used for liaison and training duties.

Operators

Regia Aeronautica
Aviazione Legionaria
Italian Co-Belligerent Air Force

Aeronautica Nazionale Repubblicana
 
Italian Air Force  operated three Fiat G.8s until 1950

Spanish Air Force

Specifications

Notes

References

 

G.008
1930s Italian military utility aircraft
Biplanes
Single-engined tractor aircraft